Mark A. Clinton (7 February 1915 – 23 December 2001) was an Irish Fine Gael politician who served as Minister for Agriculture from 1973 to 1977. He served as Member of the European Parliament (MEP) for the Leinster constituency from 1979 to 1989. He served as a Teachta Dála (TD) from 1961 to 1981.

Clinton was born to a farming family at Moynalty, Kells, County Meath, in February 1915. He was known as an accomplished Gaelic footballer in his youth and played on the Meath county team defeated by Kerry in the 1939 All-Ireland Senior Football Championship Final. He served as a member of Dublin County Council from 1955 and represented various County Dublin constituencies as a Fine Gael Teachta Dála (TD) from 1961 until his retirement from Dáil Éireann in 1981.

In 1973 he joined the Irish Government of Liam Cosgrave as Minister for Agriculture and Fisheries in the National Coalition. Clinton is best remembered as the Agriculture Minister who negotiated Ireland's entry into the European Union's Common Agricultural Policy, a development which brought billions of pounds to Irish farming and agri business. He served in government until 1977 and retired from the Dáil in 1981. Clinton also served in the European Parliament for the Leinster constituency from 1979 to 1989 and his political experience was recognised by his election as vice-president of that assembly.

Mark Clinton died in a Dublin nursing home on 23 December 2001.

References

External links

 

1915 births
2001 deaths
Fine Gael MEPs
Fine Gael TDs
Irish sportsperson-politicians
Meath inter-county Gaelic footballers
Members of the 17th Dáil
Members of the 18th Dáil
Members of the 19th Dáil
Members of the 20th Dáil
Members of the 21st Dáil
MEPs for the Republic of Ireland 1984–1989
MEPs for the Republic of Ireland 1979–1984
Ministers for Agriculture (Ireland)
Politicians from County Meath